This is a list of the Russian Navy equipment:

 Aircraft carrier
 Kuznetsov-class aircraft carrier
Battlecruiser
 Kirov-class battlecruiser
 Submarine
 Delta-class nuclear ballistic missile submarine
 Typhoon-class nuclear ballistic missile submarine
 Borey (Dolgorukiy)-class nuclear ballistic missile submarine
 Oscar-class nuclear cruise missile submarine
 Sierra-class nuclear attack submarine
 Victor-class nuclear attack submarine
 Akula-class nuclear attack submarine
 Yasen (Severodvinsk)-class nuclear attack submarine 

 Kilo-class diesel-electric submarine
 Improved Kilo-class diesel-electric submarine
 Lada (Petersburg)-class diesel-electric submarine
 Cruiser
 Kara-class cruiser 
 Slava-class cruiser
 Destroyer
 Kashin-class destroyer
 Sovremennyy-class destroyer
 Udaloy-class destroyer
 Frigate
 Burevestnik (Krivak)-class frigate
 Neustrashimy-class frigate
 Tartarstan/Gepard-class frigate
 Admiral Gorshkov-class frigate
 Corvette
 Steregushchiy-class corvette
 Parchim-class corvette
 Nanuchka-class corvette
 Tarantul-class corvette
 Grisha-class corvette
 Buyan (Astrakhan) class corvette
 Hovercraft
 Bora-class guided missile hovercraft
 Zubr-class LCAC
 Landing ship
 Alligator-class landing ship
 Ropucha-class landing ship
 Polnocny-class landing ship
 Ivan Gren-class landing ship
 Dyugon-class landing craft

Current naval aircraft

Current naval helicopters

Vehicles (naval infantry)
 T-72B
 T-80B 
 BTR-80(A) and BTR-82AM 
 2S1 Gvozdika
 BMP-3F
 MT-LB

See also
 List of battlecruisers of Russia

Equipment
 
Navy equipment
Russian Navy